The Porter Cup was a sterling silver loving cup trophy once awarded by the Porter Clothing Company to the best all-around athlete from a major southern university, including the University of Alabama, Birmingham-Southern College, Tulane and Tennessee's three major universities: Vanderbilt, Sewanee and Tennessee. The three in Tennessee were given by Alf Porter, and Alabama's was given by Henry Porter Loving. Alabama's is thus also called the "Porter Loving Cup".

List of trophy winners
The following is an incomplete list of winners since the award started shortly after the First World War:

See also
 Norris Cup

References

College football awards